Tom Flammang (born 12 January 1978) is a Luxembourgish former cyclist, who competed as a professional from 2000 to 2003 and in 2006. He also worked as a directeur sportif for the UCI Continental team  from 2014 to 2018.

Major results

1998
 1st  Road race, National Road Championships
1999
 3rd Overall Arden Challenge
1st Stage 2
2000
 5th Grand Prix de la Ville de Lillers
2001
 8th Kampioenschap van Vlaanderen
 10th Overall Guldensporentweedaagse
2005
 1st Stage 4 Flèche du Sud
 2nd  Road race, Games of the Small States of Europe
2006
 6th Overall Flèche du Sud
1st Stage 1
2008
 1st Stage 3 Flèche du Sud

Cyclo-cross
1995–1996
 2nd National Junior Championships
1998–1999
 3rd National Under-23 Championships
2003–2004
 1st  National Championships
2004–2005
 1st Cyclo-cross de Cessange
 2nd National Championships
2008–2009
 3rd National Championships
2013–2014
 2nd National Championships

References

External links

1978 births
Living people
Luxembourgian male cyclists
Sportspeople from Esch-sur-Alzette
Cyclo-cross cyclists